Acta Orthopaedica et Traumatologica Turcica is a peer-reviewed medical journal published bi-monthly by the Turkish Association of Orthopaedics and Traumatology. It is also the official journal of the Turkish Society of Orthopaedics and Traumatology. The journal is included in the Science Citation Index Expanded, Index Medicus, and TUBITAK-ULAKBIM.

History 
Acta Orthopaedica et Traumatologica Turcica was established in 1962 and published semi-annually until 1974 after which publication was quarterly. The journal has been published 6 times a year since 1988. Articles have been peer-reviewed since 1991.

Scope 
The journal publishes articles pertaining to diagnostic, treatment, and prevention methods as well as studies in basic sciences related to orthopedics and traumatology. Article types published are:

 Clinical and research articles
 Case reports
 Personal clinical and technical experiences that merit originality
 Brief reports of original studies or evaluations
 Book reviews
 Domestic and foreign article abstracts, data submitted at conferences

External links 
 
 Turkish Association of Orthopaedics and Traumatology
 Turkish Society of Orthopaedics and Traumatology

Surgery journals
Publications established in 1962
Orthopedics journals
Multilingual journals
Bimonthly journals
Academic journals published by learned and professional societies